PIC or pic may refer to:

Places
 Penbay International Circuit, or PIC, a motor track circuit in Pingtung County, Taiwan
 Pic River, in Ontario, Canada
 Picayune (Amtrak station) (Amtrak station code PIC), Mississippi, United States
 Pic, abbreviation for Pictor, a southern constellation
 Pacific island countries

People
 Anna Pic (born 1978), French politician
 Anne-Sophie Pic (born 1969), French cook
 Charles Pic (born 1990), French Formula One driver
 Maurice Pic (1866–1957), French entomologist
 Tina Pic (born 1966), American racing cyclist

Enterprises and organizations
 PIC, a mark used by the former Phoenix Iron Company
 Poison information center, a medical facility
 Public Investment Corporation, a South African state-owned asset management firm

Government and politics
 Palestinian Information Center, a news website
 Partido Independiente de Color, a former Cuban political party
 Peace Implementation Council, an international body charged with a peace plan for Bosnia and Herzegovina
 Population Investigation Committee, a United Kingdom social research group founded in 1936
 Provincial Iraqi Control, an objective of the Iraqi Government and Multi-National Forces in Iraq
 Prison–industrial complex, attribution of the U.S.'s high incarceration rate to profit
 Presidential Inaugural Committee, in the U.S.

Law and policy
 Plan inclusive counterplan, a term in policy debate
 Presubscribed interexchange carrier, or predesignated interexchange carrier, the long-distance telephone company to which calls from a subscriber line are routed by default
 Prior informed consent, a legal condition

Medicine and biochemistry
 Peripherally inserted central catheter, an intravenous access
 Pre-integration complex, a complex of proteins and genetic material used by the virus HIV
 Transcription preinitiation complex, a large complex of proteins necessary for transcription of protein-coding genes in eukaryotes

Technology
 Particle-in-cell, a technique used to solve certain partial differential equations
 Personal Internet Communicator, a 2004 consumer device designed for low-cost access to the internet
 Photonic integrated circuit, a device that integrates multiple photonic functions
 pic language, a domain-specific language for specifying diagrams
 PIC microcontroller, a family of products made by Microchip Technology
 PICtor PIC image format, a file format developed in the 1980s for PCPaint
 Pixar Image Computer, a 1980s high-end graphics computer
 Plastic identification code, a symbol used to identify types of plastic for recycling
 Polymorphic inline cache, a virtual machine optimization technology
 Position-independent code, machine instruction code that executes properly regardless of where in memory it resides
 Programmable integrated circuit, an electronic component
 Programmable interrupt controller, an integrated circuit type

Other uses
 Particulate inorganic carbon, found in the ocean
 Paid-in capital, contributed to a corporation by investors on top of the par value of capital stock
 Pharmaceutical Inspection Convention, an international instrument between countries and pharmaceutical inspection authorities
 Philippine Independent Church, a Christian denomination
 Pic (novel), 1971, by Jack Kerouac
 Picard group, in algebraic geometry
 Piccadilly line, or "The Pic", on the London Underground
 Pilot in command, the person aboard an aircraft responsible for its operation and safety during flight
 PIC, an abbreviation used in fandom for the American television series Star Trek: Picard

See also
 Picture (common abbreviation)
 
 
  (a common beginning to French mountain peak names)